Lost Together is the fourth studio album by Blue Rodeo. It was Bob Wiseman's last album with the band, and was the first to feature drummer Glenn Milchem, and steel guitar player Kim Deschamps.

Notable hits from the album included "Rain Down on Me," "Flying," "Already Gone" and the title track.

The album was a Juno Award nominee for Album of the Year at the Juno Awards of 1993.

During the COVID-19 pandemic in Canada in 2020, CBC Music organized and released a "Great Canadian Singalong" of the title track, with several hundred Canadians submitting video of themselves singing the song in their homes for inclusion in the final mix.

Songs
The album's opening track, "Fools Like You", is a song Greg Keelor wrote about his disgust about continued abuse of Natives in Canada. Keelor explained in a 1992 interview: "It's about how atrocious our European forefathers were in the taking of this land and how the tradition is still continued in our present day. It was written after the Oka thing. I was freaked out and disgusted by it."

"Restless" is a song that was written about the demise of social welfare programs in America during the Ronald Reagan and George Bush administrations.

Track listing
All songs by Greg Keelor and Jim Cuddy.

"Fools Like You"  – 4:31
"Rain Down On Me"  – 4:43
"Restless"  – 3:54
"Western Skies"  – 4:19
"The Big Push"  – 4:25
"Willin' Fool"  – 6:40
"Already Gone"  – 5:15
"Flying"  – 4:11
"Lost Together"  – 5:20
"Where Are You Now"  – 5:33
"Last to Know"  – 5:33
"Is it You"  – 3:52
"Angels"  – 7:59

Chart performance

Certifications

References

1992 albums
Blue Rodeo albums